What Do You Want From Me(?) may refer to:

What Do You Want from Me (album), by Orfeh, 2008
"What Do You Want from Me?" (Cascada song), 2008
"What Do You Want from Me?" (Monaco song), 1997
"What Do You Want from Me" (Pink Floyd song), 1994
"What Do You Want from Me" (Forever the Sickest Kids song), 2009
"What Do You Want from Me?", by Take That from Progress, 2010
"Whataya Want from Me", a 2009 song by Adam Lambert